The Arab Unity Party was a political party in Iraq. The party was founded around late 1967 or 1968, as the group around Sobhi Abdul Hamid, Khalid Ali as-Salah and Khiruddin Hassib broke away from one of the factions of the Arab Socialist Movement. The activity of the party inside Iraq was ended by the July 17, 1968, revolution. But a smaller group of the party continued to function in exile. The party was disbanded in 1971, as Sobhi Abdul Hamid withdrew from his political activities.

References

Arab nationalism in Iraq
Arab nationalist political parties
Defunct political parties in Iraq
Nationalist parties in Iraq